TV Vlaanderen is a digital satellite television and terrestrial television service provider for the Flanders region in Belgium.

TV Vlaanderen's customers are mostly people living in Flanders. However, as TV Vlaanderen is officially available to the whole of Belgium, TV Vlaanderen also has many Flemish customers living in the French-speaking part of Belgium due to the unavailability of Dutch-language TV channels on cable television platforms in Wallonia.

Like the Dutch satellite television provider CanalDigitaal, TV Vlaanderen is owned by M7 Group (Canal+ Luxembourg S.a.r.l). M7 Group since September 2019 is part of French-based Groupe Canal+, which is a subsidiary of Vivendi.

History 
Originally, TV Vlaanderen only offered a DVB-S2 satellite television service, using the SES Astra satellites at Astra 19.2°E and at Astra 23.5°E.

In 2017, it started a DVB-T2 terrestrial service branded "Antenne TV", which uses the Norkring transmitter network.

Smart card 
The Flemish public and commercial broadcasts are not freely available via satellite. To receive the Flemish broadcasts, a Smartcard is required to decipher the Mediaguard signal.

A standard DVB-S2 receiver is used, which can also receive free-to-air broadcasts.

References

External links 
 

Direct broadcast satellite services
Private equity portfolio companies
Telecommunications companies of Belgium
Zaventem
M7 Group